Amphipyra alpherakii is a moth in the family Noctuidae. It is found in China.

References
 Plate CIX. fig. 3.

 Plate 38 e.

Amphipyrinae
Moths of Asia
Moths described in 1888